Peter Greenall may refer to:
 Peter Greenall (politician), British brewer and politician
 Peter Greenall, 4th Baron Daresbury, British aristocrat and businessman associated primarily with horseracing